Kurt Landesberger (19 February 1913, Vienna, Austria – 13 July 1997 New York City) was an Austrian born Argentine film director of the 1950s and 1960s.

Born in Vienna, Land moved to Argentina in the 1930s and began as a film editor, editing for some 20 films in the 1940s. However, by the early 1950s he became interested in directing and directed a number of popular Argentine films in the 1950s such as the 1955 film Adiós problemas starring Enrique Muiño and the 1957 picture Alfonsina which starred actress Amelia Bence. He also worked regularly with classic Argentine actress Olga Zubarry.

He directed his last film in 1970 in Buenos Aires. He died in New York City in 1997.

Selected filmography

Editor
Madame Bovary (1947)
Stella (1943) Credited as Kurt Land.
La casta Susana (1944) Credited as Kurt Land.
Villa Rica del Espíritu Santo (1945) Credited as Kurt Land.
Lauracha (1946) Credited as Kurt Land.

Producer
 Seven Women (1944)

Director

 Hoy canto para ti (1950)
 ¡Qué hermanita! (1951)
 Vuelva el primero (1952)
 Como yo no hay dos (1952)
 Asunto terminado (1953)
 Mercado negro (1953)
 La telaraña (1954)
 Los problemas de papá (1954)
 Adiós problemas (1955)
 La Delatora (1955)
 Bacará (1955)
 Surcos en el mar (1956)
 Estrellas de Buenos Aires (1956)
 Alfonsina  (1957)
 Dos basuras  (1958)
 Evangelina (1959)
 El asalto  (1960)
 La Culpa  (1969)
 El sátiro  (1970)
 El Hombre del año  (1970)

External links
 

1913 births
1997 deaths
Austrian film directors
Argentine film directors
Austrian film editors
Argentine film editors
Austrian emigrants to Argentina